Sessa may refer to:

Places
Sessa, Switzerland, a municipality in Ticino
Sessa Aurunca, a town in the province of Caserta, Campania, Italy
Roman Catholic Diocese of Sessa Aurunca
Sessa Cilento, a town in the province of Salerno, Campania, Italy

People
Duke of Sessa, Spanish nobility
Carmine Sessa, American 1990s mobster
Gastón Sessa (born 1973), Argentine footballer
Sessa, a.k.a. Sissa, mythical brahmin